Phool Chand Verma  (born 12 June 1939, Indore) is an Indian politician, a former member of the Lok Sabha and a leader of Bharatiya Janata Party. He was first elected to the Lok Sabha from Ujjain constituency in Madhya Pradesh state in 1971 as a Bharatiya Jana Sangh candidate. He was elected to the 6th, 7th, 9th and 10th Lok Sabha (1977-1984, and 1989-1996) from Shajapur constituency (reserved for Scheduled Caste candidates) in Madhya Pradesh state.

References 

1939 births
Living people
India MPs 1971–1977
India MPs 1977–1979
India MPs 1980–1984
India MPs 1989–1991
India MPs 1991–1996
Lok Sabha members from Madhya Pradesh
People from Ujjain
People from Shajapur
Bharatiya Jana Sangh politicians
Janata Party politicians
Bharatiya Janata Party politicians from Madhya Pradesh